The Four Golden Flowers was a TV theme song musical performance group in the early 1970s. They are one of the first all-girl modern music group in Hong Kong.

The members include Lydia Shum (沈殿霞), Liza Wang (汪明荃), Felicia Wong (王愛明) and Teresa Cheung (張德蘭).

The group once performed on the show Enjoy Yourself Tonight.

Legacy
Many famous Hong Kong actresses were in this group. The Four Golden Flowers produced Lydia Shum (Fei-Fei), who died on February 26, 2008, because of liver cancer. The group also produced "The Big Sister" Liza Wang, who played an important part in the growth of Hong Kong's entertainment industry.

See also
 Music of Hong Kong

References

Hong Kong musical groups
Cantonese-language singers